NA-195 Larkana-II is a newly-created constituency for the National Assembly of Pakistan. It mainly comprises the Dokri Taluka, Bakrani Taluka, and some areas of the Larkana Taluka, which includes a portion of the city of Larkana. It was created in the 2018 delimitation after the constituency overlapping between Qambar Shahdadkot District and Larkana District was ended.

Election 2018 

General elections are scheduled to be held on 25 July 2018.

See also
NA-194 Larkana-I
NA-196 Qambar Shahdadkot-I

References 

Larkana